Ossett  is a market town in West Yorkshire, England, within the City of Wakefield. Historically part of the West Riding of Yorkshire, it is situated between Dewsbury, Horbury and Wakefield. At the 2021 census, the town had a population of 21,861. Ossett forms part of the Heavy Woollen District.

History

Toponymy
The name Ossett derives from the Old English and is either "the fold of a man named Osla" or " a fold frequented by blackbirds".
Ossett is sometimes misspelled as "Osset". In Ellis' On Early English Pronunciation, one of the founding works of British linguistics, the incorrect spelling is used. The British Library has an online dialect study that uses the spelling. One new alternative theory is that it is the place where King Osbehrt died after receiving fatal wounds when fighting the Great Heathen Army of the Vikings at York on 21 March 867. An exceedingly rare clustering of high status Anglian graves, one bearing the Anglian royal symbol of the dragon and the name Osbehrt, was found in the churchyard at Thornhill Parish Church directly across the valley from – and within sight of – Ossett.

Origins
Ossett appears in the 1086 Domesday Book as "Osleset" in the Manor of Wakefield. The Domesday Book was compiled for William the Conqueror in 1086. "Osleset" was recorded as three and a half carucates which is the land needed to be ploughed by three teams of eight oxen. Woodland pasture measured "half a league long as much broad" (roughly six furlongs by six furlongs). Four villeins and three bordars lived in Osleset.

Industrial Revolution
Coal-mining was, up to the late 1960s, Ossett's second industry in terms of people employed and the first in terms of males employed. Coal has been mined since the 14th century and there were a large number of pits in Ossett during the 19th century. The pits included Old Roundwood, opened in 1851 mining the Gawthorpe seam. The Haigh Moor seam opened in 1860 and the Silkstone seam opened in 1893. Pildacre pit shut due to flooding in 1875 but remained as a source of water for Ossett. Westfield shut in the early 1900s. The Chidswell riot in 1893 was caused by striking miners trying to reach Westfield to stop other miners working. Another pit down Healey Road was also the scene of tension between police and striking miners. Low Laithes pit shut in 1926, however the seams later flooded and were responsible for the Lofthouse Colliery disaster in 1973. Greatfield shut in the 1950s, Old Roundwood shut in 1966 and Shaw Cross, on the Ossett/Dewsbury border near the current Dewsbury Rugby League stadium, closed in 1968.

Author and local resident Stan Barstow said that Ossett and Horbury were the "border country" where the north-west of the coalfield merged with the south-east of the wool towns. Local historian John Goodchild said, "The place was essentially one of small mines and small mills". The town was once a thriving centre of the "shoddy" industry; recycling woollen garments. Whilst some mill towns employed mostly females in its textile sector, Ossett's mills always had roughly equal numbers of men and women. The town's mills were generally small, but they had a reputation as high-quality producers. Whitehead's Mill used to have a carnival float that said "We Export to the World" at the Gawthorpe May Pole parade.

During the 1970s, Woodhead Manufacturing employed 1,500 people on this site in its two premises fronting Church Street and Kingsway. The shock absorber business was the last part of the site operations to close in the early 1990s. The site is now a housing estate and Woodhead's exists in name only and is run from an industrial estate in Leeds. 
There is however, a large old 'mill type' building situated on Church Street, which, prior to its refurbishment, had shown Woodhead signage in large blue lettering on the buildings' facade. 
The building was for many years left in a very derelict and dangerous state, largely due to vandalism. Arson in particular inflicted significant damage, leaving the buildings' roof black and charred. 
Building work was attempted many times until the building was eventually renovated and converted into flats in 2016.
The yard and building has a large stone wall and locked iron gates to the front, which edges right up to the pavement on Church Street, and high metal fencing to the rear, which edges up to a grassed area next to the large housing estate. 
The housing estate situated at the rear, is fairly large and has a selection of mixed style and sized modern houses and four-storey flats, occupied by singletons, couples and families.

Second World War
In the Second World War, Ossett was accidentally bombed on 16 September 1940. Ten High Explosive bombs were dropped. No one was killed, save for a number of chickens and several properties were damaged. Later in the war a V-1's engine was reportedly heard to cut out, and came down at Grange Moor, to the west of the town.

Spa
Ossett was, for a brief period in the 19th century, a spa town. Having been founded by a local stonemason who was inspired by Harrogate and Cheltenham, the waters were popular with those seeking relief from certain skin diseases in the early 19th century, but it remained a small spa during this period. In the 1870s, a plan to transform Ossett into a "second Harrogate" ended in failure, and the spa closed as a result.  The south-east of the town is still known as "Ossett Spa".

Governance

Ossett cum Gawthorpe was a township in the ancient parish of Dewsbury; it became a civil parish in 1866, and was incorporated as the Municipal Borough of Ossett in 1890. Under the Local Government Act 1972, it became an unparished area in the City of Wakefield. In an earlier draft of the Act, Ossett was to be part of the Kirklees district on the grounds that the area was originally part of the parish of Dewsbury; after an appeal by the Ossett Labour Party, it was decided Ossett would be part of the Wakefield district.

Ossett has changed its parliamentary constituency several times. In 1983, the town transferred from the Dewsbury seat to the Normanton constituency.

Since the 2010 election, Ossett has been part of the Wakefield constituency. The seat has been held by Simon Lightwood of the Labour Party since the 2022 Wakefield by-election. The by-election was triggered by the resignation of Imran Ahmad Khan, who had been expelled from the Conservative Party following his conviction for sexual assault. From 2010 to 2019, the MP for Wakefield was Mary Creagh of the Labour Party. When Ossett was part of the Dewsbury constituency, the MP was David Ginsburg, one of the Labour MPs who defected to the Social Democratic Party. On transferring to the Normanton constituency, the MP for many years was Bill O'Brien until he entered the House of Lords and was succeeded by Ed Balls.

Most of the town is in the Ossett ward on the local council, but the south-eastern part of the town is in the Horbury and South Ossett ward.  The Ossett ward is extremely marginal, and has been won over the last ten years by Labour, Liberal Democrat, Conservative and UKIP candidates.  As of 29 October 2019, the ward is represented by two Conservative councillors and one Labour councillor.  Horbury and South Ossett is marginal between Labour and Conservative, with only low votes for the other parties.

There is a small area of Ossett (defined within the pre-1974 boundaries) in the Wakefield West ward, but this is mostly a business area with few residents (an industrial park was built on the site of the Old Roundwood Colliery).  There is also a very small area around the Waggon and Horses pub on Wakefield Road that has a WF5 Ossett address but is part of the Kirklees district and the Dewsbury East ward.

Geography

Climate
Ossett experiences an oceanic climate (Köppen climate classification Cfb) similar to almost all of the United Kingdom.

Demography

At the 2011 Census, the population was 21,231. Ossett's convenient proximity to the M1 motorway has led the old industrial town to become more affluent in recent years, attracting both industry and resident commuters to Leeds. This leaves Ossett with higher priced housing compared to nearby areas.

Economy
There are four operational textile mills in the town: Ings Mill, on Dale Street, deals in recycled textiles; Burmatex Ltd, based at Victoria Mills on the Green produce carpet tiles; Edward Clay & Son Ltd, Wesley Street manufactures felts for the mattress making and horticultural industries and Wilson Briggs & Son by the River Calder off Healey Road deals with textile mill waste and remnant processing. Other have been converted into units, some of the most prominent being Royd's Mill on the Leeds Road roundabout and the large congregation of mills in the Healey area. Some mills remain derelict.

Ossett is home to two real ale breweries. Ossett Brewery, located in Healey and Bob's Brewing Company, formerly the Red Lion Brewery.

Landmarks

Trinity Church was consecrated in 1865 and its spire which rises to 226 feet is a landmark that can be seen for miles around.
A red phone booth in Ossett town centre, opposite the Kingsway roundabout, is a grade II listed building.
Ossett Town Hall celebrated its centenary in June 2008. Gawthorpe, an area of north Ossett, is known for its landmark water tower.

Transport
The Romans constructed a road from Halifax to Wakefield, this road became a turnpike road in 1741, its route is roughly similar to the modern day Dewsbury Road. Streetside Post Office is a reminder of the Roman origins of the road. The M1 motorway between Junctions 40 and 42 to the east of Ossett was opened in April 1967. The stretch from junction 38 to 40 was opened in October 1968. The Highways Agency have plans to widen the M1 to 4 lanes between Chesterfield and Leeds. In 2005 a bus station was opened in the town built by West Yorkshire Metro replacing an earlier bus station constructed in the 1970s.

The railways arrived in Ossett in 1862 when the Bradford, Wakefield & Leeds Railway company opened a branch line to Flushdyke. The line was extended to Ossett in 1864 and then onto Dewsbury and Batley.
Ossett railway station, located roughly where Southdale Gardens now is, was opened in 1889 by the Great Northern Railway. The line ran underneath Station Road and the bump in the road today is the only reminder of the bridge that used to exist there until its removal in the 1980s. The railway station closed in 1964. The town was close to four other railway stations: Chickenley Heath closed in 1911, Earlsheaton in 1953, Flushdyke closed in 1941 and Horbury & Ossett in 1970. It is now the largest town in Yorkshire and one of the largest towns in Britain without a railway station. Railway sidings and yards are still to be found at the old Horbury & Ossett railway station site and Healey Mills Marshalling Yard where Queen Elizabeth II spent a night aboard the Royal Train during her 1977 Silver Jubilee tour.

In June 2009, the Association of Train Operating Companies proposed Ossett, as one of seven English towns with a strong business case for the location of a new railway station. It is likely that an unstaffed station would be erected at Healey Mills.

Ossett bus station is situated in the town centre next to Prospect Road (B6128) and Ossett Town's football ground. The bus station is managed and owned by West Yorkshire Metro, and was rebuilt in 2005; it has six stands and a real-time information board. The main operator at the bus station is Arriva Yorkshire. Buses run around the town and regularly to Wakefield and Dewsbury and also to Leeds and Batley.

Education
Ossett has nine primary schools; Gawthorpe Community Academy, Ossett Flushdyke School, Towngate Primary Academy; Ossett Holy Trinity C of E Primary School, St Ignatius Catholic Primary School, Ossett South Parade Primary, South Ossett Infant Academy, Ossett Southdale C of E Junior School and Dimplewell Infants School and Nursery. Ossett has one mainstream secondary school, Ossett Academy & Sixth Form College, and then has The Grange School, which is an independent special school and Highfield School which caters for children aged 11 to 16 who have learning difficulties, using the buildings of the old North Ossett High School which closed in 1997.

Religion

There are seven churches in the town, each with their own particular identities and initiatives. Many of the leaders of these churches meet regularly to collaborate and support each other. In the 18th and 19th centuries, the town had a reputation as a centre of religious Nonconformism. Although Nonconformist churches were common all over West Yorkshire, Ossett was a particular hotbed. In 1890, seventeen different churches were recorded in Ossett, excluding "spiritualist churches". Trinity Church is one of the two Anglican churches in the town. The other is Christ Church, South Ossett. St Mary's Church on Dewsbury Road closed in 2002, and its parish was divided between Dewsbury (Chickenley) and Ossett and Gawthorpe (Gawthorpe).

St. Ignatius Roman Catholic Church was built in 1878. The Salvation Army is the only church in Gawthorpe. The Salvation Army building also acts as a community centre providing dinners for senior citizens & two parent & toddler groups. There is also a Kingdom Hall of Jehovah's Witnesses on Ventnor Way, and a spiritualist church in the town centre. The King's Way church on Ventnor Way is a Methodist and United Reformed church.

Sport
Ossett Rugby are based at Ossett Cricket and Athletic Club and play at Southdale playing fields with two men's and one senior ladies team with a girls team recently started to extend the rugby offering in the town to all ages.

Ossett Trinity, the local rugby league club, resigned from the Rugby League Conference in 2006. Ossett Cricket Club also play at Dimplewells. The Heavy Woollen District has its own cricket association and its own cricket team. Residents of Ossett are eligible to play for the Heavy Woollen District team.

Ossett hosted two semi-professional football teams, both played in the Northern Premier League Division One North: Ossett Town played at Ingfield, and neighbours Ossett Albion played at Queen's Terrace, more commonly known as Dimplewells. In February 2018, the two clubs announced an agreement to merge under the name Ossett United.  For the remainder of the 2017–18 season, a season ticket at either club is valid for matches at either Ossett Albion or Ossett Town.

There was an Ossett Football Club in the 1890s, they played in the original West Yorkshire League, but the oldest current club in Ossett is Ossett Common Rovers, formed in 1910 and currently playing in the modern West Yorkshire League. Other clubs in Ossett include Ossett Wanderers, Ossett United and Ossett Panthers. Little Bull F.C., Ossett Two Brewers and AFC Two Brewers play in the Wakefield & District League.

The Yorkshire and the Humber branch of the Disability Sports Federation has its headquarters on the Longlands Industrial Estate in the town.

Culture and media
The Wakefield Express and the Dewsbury Reporter  report local news. The Wakefield Express publishes an Ossett Edition, and also contains an Ossett and district section. Ossett has a free magazine The Ossett Review established in July 2005. The Ossett Civic Trust produce a quarterly newsletter Ossett Times.

Gawthorpe hosts the annual World Coal-Carrying Championships (Easter Monday) and an annual Maypole parade in May. Ossett Beercart takes place on the first weekend of June. Ossett Gala takes place in July. The turning on of the Christmas lights is another focal point for the community, along with the fire station's bonfire on the Friday evening nearest to 5 November. The Ossett Beer Festival takes place annually at the Brewers' Pride pub, Healey Road, Ossett over the August bank holiday weekend.

 The town is mentioned in the song It's Grim Up North by The KLF.
 Ossett was defined as "wheeare the' black-leead t'tram lines" in both A Yorkshireman's Dictionary by Peter Wright and The Yorkshire Dictionary by Arnold Kellett, although neither book gives any explanation for this. One interpretation is that it was mocking the town's heavy pollution when it was industrialised. Another is that Ossett people were seen as fussy and pedantic.
 From Austin Mitchell's Talkin' Yorkshire (page 48):
 In moments of extreme anger Ossett fish-puddlers have been known to resent "thou" and reply "Don't thee thou me thee thou thissen and see how tha likes thee thouing" but this is rare.
Ossett is the home of Wakefield Orchestral Wind (WOW), an orchestral wind band with a varied repertoire including popular film music, show music, big band, classical and their conductor's own arrangements. The band plays regularly at local events, such as Ossett Gala, Horbury Show and Camphill Pennine Community Summer Fair.
Software house Team17 was previously based there, and their most famous game – "Worms" – contained a Hell level with a sign saying, "Welcome to Ossett". In the sequel Worms 2, there is the cheat code 'OSSETT', which enables the levels from the first game.
 Ossett is defined in the "Meaning of liff" as "a frilly spare-toilet-roll-cosy"

Notable people

 The astronomer Cyril Jackson (1903–1988), who moved to South Africa, was born in Ossett, and honoured the town when he named the asteroid 1244 Deira; the citation he submitted to the IAU boils down to "Ancient name of Ossett, Yorkshire". This is something of an exaggeration, as the ancient Celtic Kingdom of Deira actually encompassed (at its height) most of Yorkshire.
 Benjamin Ingham (1712–1772), founder of the Inghamite Methodists was born in Ossett. He was educated at Batley Grammar School and Queen's College, Oxford. He was ordained in 1735 and accompanied John and Charles Wesley as a missionary to the colony of Georgia in the USA. In 1737, after his return to Ossett, Ingham started to establish the Inghamite Methodists after being banned in 1739 from preaching in churches. By 1755 there were over eighty Inghamite congregations, mainly in Yorkshire and Lancashire. A vestige of Ingham's Church still survives in the Lancashire/Yorkshire border area.
 Eli Marsden Wilson, A.R.E., A.R.C.E. (1877–1965) was a successful Ossett-born artist who had seventeen pictures exhibited at the Royal Academy. After studying at Wakefield College of Art, he moved to the Royal College of Art in London where he became a pupil of Sir Frank Short. The first picture Wilson exhibited at the R.A. in 1905 was an etching of Ossett Market as it was in Victorian times. There is a copy of "Ossett Market" by E. M. Wilson on display in Wakefield Art Gallery.
 Thomas Cussons (chemist) first established the Cussons personal care brand in Ossett. The initials of Thomas' eldest son John W. Cussons (1867–1922) can still be found on the wall of the original building, now the Yorkshire Bank on Station Road. Thomas's youngest son Alex T. Cussons (1875–1951), who was apprenticed in Ossett, went on to manufacture the famous Cussons Imperial Leather soap.
 Michael Taylor, born c.1944, who became notable in 1974 as a result of an Ossett murder case.
 Sir Edward Luckhoo, Governor General of Guyana, lived in Ossett in retirement, and is buried in the town.

Writers
 Novelist Stan Barstow (1928–2011), the author of A Kind of Loving, was born in Horbury, yet lived almost all of his life in Ossett and attended Ossett Grammar School.
The crime novelist David Peace (b. 1967), originates from Ossett and set the first six of his books in the West Riding.
 Elaine Storkey, (née Lively): (b.1944), broadcaster, writer and academic, was brought up in Ossett and wrote for the Ossett Observer as a child. She was Head Girl of Ossett Grammar School in 1962.
 Mabel Ferrett, poet, publisher, literary editor and local historian, was born in Ossett

Actors and musicians
 Black Lace, British pop group, notable for their 1984 single "Agadoo".
 Jill Summers (actress, known for playing Phyllis Pearce in Coronation Street), lived in the town.
 Helen Worth (actress, known for playing Gail Platt in Coronation Street) was born and brought up in Ossett.

Sportspeople
 Richard Wood, defender with Sheffield Wednesday F.C.
 Barry Wood, former Yorkshire, Lancashire and England cricketer, was born and brought up in Ossett.
 David Raw, cricketer

See also 
 South Ossett
 Listed buildings in Ossett

References 
 

Bibliography

"Bygone Ossett", Norman Ellis, Rickaro Books, November 2003, 
"Old Ordnance Survey Maps: Ossett 1890", Alan Godfrey Maps, 
"The King's England: Yorkshire, West Riding", Arthur Mee

External links

 Wilson, Stephen; "Did the Romans colonise Ossett?"; Ossettcivictrust.co.uk. Retrieved 4 May 2012

 
Towns in West Yorkshire
Market towns in West Yorkshire
Unparished areas in West Yorkshire
Geography of the City of Wakefield
Heavy Woollen District